Parasenecio hastatus (Chinese: 山尖子, shānjiānzi) is a flowering plant species in the genus Parasenecio found in China and East Asia. It contains toxic pyrrolizidine alkaloids.

References

External links 

 Parasenecio hastatus at en.hortipedia.com

Senecioneae
Plants described in 1753
Taxa named by Carl Linnaeus